A concerto is a musical work generally composed of three parts or movements, in which, usually, one solo instrument is accompanied by an orchestra.

Concerto or Concertos may also refer to:

Music
 Concerto (Barraqué), 1962–1968 composition by Jean Barraqué 
 Concerto: One Night in Central Park, an album by Andrea Bocelli
 Concertos (album), a 1997 album by Michael Nyman
 Concerto (Roxy Music album) (1979)
 Concertos, an album by Michael Mantler
 Concerto, an album by Vincenzo Zitello

Other uses
 "Concerto" (The Avengers),  twenty-fourth episode of the third series of The Avengers
 Concerto (ballet), a 1966 ballet by Kenneth MacMillan
 Concerto (manga), a Japanese yuri manga 
 Concerto (TV series), a Canadian music television miniseries 
 Honda Concerto, a Honda hatchback related to the Rover 200
 Concerto Signage, an open source digital signage system